The Medjez-El-Bab Memorial is a Commonwealth War Graves Commission war memorial in the Medjez-el-Bab War Cemetery near Majaz al Bab, Tunisia. The memorial commemorates 2,525 Commonwealth forces members who died  in Tunisia and Algeria during World War II and have no known grave.

References

Commonwealth War Graves Commission memorials
Western Desert campaign
World War II memorials